Banana Man may refer to:

Comic books, TV and other media 
 Bananaman, a British comic book and cartoon character
 Bananaman (TV series)
 Banana Man, a comic series created in 2000 and published by Crack Comics

Comedy 
 Banana man, the funny man in a comedy double act
 The Banana Man, an American vaudeville performer
 Bananaman (comedy duo), a Japanese comedy duo

Music 
 Banana Man (album) (1997), by Ghoti Hook
 Bananamen, side-project of London group The Sting-rays
 "Banana Man", a song by the band Tally Hall, from their 2005 album Marvin's Marvelous Mechanical Museum

People 
 Sam Zemurray (nicknamed "Sam the Banana Man"), a U.S. businessman who made his fortune in the banana trade
 Ray Comfort, Christian evangelist and prominent creationist, derisively nicknamed "Banana Man" after his argument that the banana disproves evolution gained notoriety

Other 
 "Hombre Banano" (Banana Man), the nickname of a wall mural painted by Blu
 The Dancing Banana emoticon, an Internet phenomenon also known as "Banana Man"
 In mathematics, the category of Banach analytic manifolds is sometimes denoted by BanAnaMan